Nosirbek Otakuziev is an Uzbekistan footballer who currently plays for Kokand 1912 in the Uzbek League. He plays as a striker.

Career
He played for Neftchi Farg'ona in 2003-2009. In 2010, he moved to Olmaliq FK. Playing for Olmaliq FK he became League best goalscorer with 13 goals. 
In 2011, he moved to Nasaf Qarshi. Otakuziev scored an important goal in the opening round of the group stage in the 2011 AFC Cup when he scored in the 77th minute against Al-Ansar Club. He made significant contribution of winning by Nasaf 2011 AFC Cup. He scored totally 5 goals and became 2nd best goal scorer of Nasaf in that year competition after Ivan Bošković with 10 goals. In League matches he scored 6 goals and also was 2nd best goal club scorer. In 2015, he moved to Kokand 1912.

Honours

Club
Nasaf
Uzbek League runners-up: 2011
Uzbek Cup runners-up (3): 2011
AFC Cup (1): 2011

Individual
Uzbek League Top Scorer: 2010 (13 goals)

References

External links
 
 Nosirbek Otakuziev- Footballdatabase

1984 births
Living people
Uzbekistani footballers
Footballers at the 2006 Asian Games
Association football forwards
Uzbekistan Super League players
Asian Games competitors for Uzbekistan
Uzbekistan international footballers
FK Neftchi Farg'ona players
FC AGMK players
FC Nasaf players